Talaga is a surname. In Old Polish, it referred to a type of wagon. Notable people with the surname include:
 Tanya Talaga, Canadian journalist
 John Talaga, American musician

See also

References

Polish-language surnames